Xing Qiyi was a Chinese organic chemist who contributed to the total synthesis of bovine insulin, Xing is still well-known nowadays in China as the main editor of a highly-influential organic chemistry textbook. He was a member of China Democratic League since 1952.

Early life and education 
Xing received Chinese traditional private education in his childhood. In 1933, he graduated from Fu Jen Catholic University with a diploma in Chemistry. Xing did his postgraduate work at University of Illinois at Urbana–Champaign under Roger Adams's guidance and obtained a doctorate degree in 1936. Later he went to University of Munich, conducting research on bufotoxins at Wieland's laboratory.

Career 
In 1937, Xing returned to China. He moved to Kunming since eastern China was occupied by Japanese invaders. There, he spent some efforts on the refining of Quinine. Then Xing joined the New Fourth Army as a teacher in its military medical school. Moreover, he assisted the army to product medicine.

In 1946, Xing went back to Beijing and accepted an appointment as a professor at Peking University.

In 1950s, Xing designed a new method to synthesize the chloramphenicol.

During 1964–65, Xing participated in the total synthesis of bovine insulin project, co-operating with Shanghai Institutes for Biological Sciences.

In 1980, Xing was elected as an academician of the Chinese Academy of Sciences.

During 1981–87, Xing focused on the activation methods for the carboxyl group in the peptide synthesis, and developed related chemical reagents.

Personal life 
Xing enjoyed collecting crafts relevant the tortoise.

Xing's father Duan was a member of Hanlin Academy in the Late Qing dynasty, he once studied in Japan and used to be an officer at the Beiyang government. Xing's mother, Zhang Xian, was a housewife. Xing and his wife Qian Cunrou, a microbiologist, had two sons.

References 

1911 births
2002 deaths
Chemists from Tianjin
Educators from Tianjin
Catholic University of Peking alumni
Members of the Chinese Academy of Sciences
Organic chemists
Academic staff of Peking University